Cadoux is a town in the northeastern Wheatbelt region of Western Australia.

The townsite was gazetted in 1929 and the railway siding was opened in the same year. It was on the Amery–Kalannie line at 149 miles 49 chains.

The main industry in town is wheat farming with the town being a Cooperative Bulk Handling receival site.

Cadoux earthquakes
Cadoux, and neighbouring Burakin to the north, are considered unusually seismically active for Australia, with minor earthquakes reported on an annual basis. Notable events include in 2001 (Burakin swarm) and in 2022.

The most significant event, however, was on 2 June 1979 with a significant earthquake just east of the town. It had a Richter magnitude of 6.1 and was the second most damaging earthquake in the history of Western Australia. Damage to the area was estimated to be A$3.8 million (in 1979 dollars). Only one injury was recorded in the entire earthquake−a broken arm sustained by a child from falling masonry.

See also
 Earthquakes in Western Australia

Notes

References
 Higham, Geoffrey Where was That? an historical gazetteer of Western Australia.  Geoproject Solutions, Winthrop, W.A.

External links

Cadoux Earthquake
Shire of Wongan-Ballidu

Towns in Western Australia
Earthquakes in Western Australia
Wheatbelt (Western Australia)
Grain receival points of Western Australia